Coptodryas elegans is a species of ambrosia beetles in the tribe Xyleborini (highly specialized weevils of the subfamily Scolytinae). It is found in Asia (Burma, India, Indonesia) and the Pacific. The type locality is Raja Bhat Khawa in Bengal. It can be found on Albizzia moluccana, Eugenia jambolana, Lansium sp. and Shorea robusta.

References

Footnotes 
 

 Coptodryas elegans at xyleborini.speciesfile.org

Scolytinae
Beetles described in 1992
Beetles of Asia